Hermann August Teuchert (3 March 1880 − 13 January 1972) was a German historical linguist.

Teuchert was born in Loppow (Neumark) In 1920 he was granted the newly created professorship for Low German Philology at the University of Rostock and served in this position until 1946. He died in Heidelberg at the age of 91.

His son was the art historian Wolfgang Teuchert.

Bibliography 
 Mecklenburgisches Wörterbuch
 Brandenburg-Berlinisches Wörterbuch
 Niederdeutsche Mundarten, 1933
 Der mecklenburgische Sprachraum, 1929
 Die Sprachreste der niederländischen Siedlungen des 12. Jahrhunderts, 1944 – Language remnants from Dutch settlements of the 12th century.

References

External links 
 
 Kultur Portal Mecklenburg-Vorpommern

20th-century linguists
20th-century philologists
Linguists from Germany
Historical linguists
German philologists
Low German
University of Rostock
1880 births
1972 deaths
People from the Province of Brandenburg
German male writers
Members of the German Academy of Sciences at Berlin